The 2017–18 Quinnipiac Bobcats women's basketball team represents Quinnipiac University  during the 2017–18 NCAA Division I women's basketball season. The Bobcats are led by twenty-third year head coach, Tricia Fabbri. They play their home games in TD Bank Sports Center and are members of the Metro Atlantic Athletic Conference. They finished the season 28–6, 18–0 in MAAC play to win MAAC regular season and tournament titles to earn an automatic trip to the NCAA women's tournament. They defeated Miami in the first round before losing to Connecticut in the second round.

Previous season
They finished the season 29–7, 17–3 in MAAC play to win MAAC regular season and tournament titles to earn an automatic trip to the NCAA women's tournament.. They upset Marquette and Miami (FL) in the first and second rounds before falling to eventual champions South Carolina in the sweet sixteen.

Roster

Schedule

|-
!colspan=9 style=| Non-conference regular season

|-
!colspan=9 style=| MAAC regular season

|-
!colspan=9 style=| MAAC Women's Tournament

|-
!colspan=9 style=| NCAA Women's Tournament

Rankings
2017–18 NCAA Division I women's basketball rankings

See also
 2017–18 Quinnipiac Bobcats men's basketball team

References

Quinnipiac Bobcats women's basketball seasons
Quinnipiac
Quinnipiac